Portugal is a surname derived from the country of the same name.  Other spellings of the surname include Portingale, Portigall, Pothergill, Potteril, Puttergill, and Putterill.  People with the name Portugal include:
Alfonso Portugal (1934–2016), Mexican football player
Anne Portugal (b. 1949), French poet
Francisco de Portugal, 3rd Count of Vimioso (1550–1582), Portuguese nobleman, Constable of António, Prior of Crato, during the War of the Portuguese Succession (1580–1583).
Eliezer Zusia Portugal (1898–1982), Rabbi (first Skulener Rebbe)
Hugo Sánchez Portugal (1984–2014), Mexican football commentator
Marcelo Portugal Gouvêa (1938–2008), Brazilian football manager
Marcos Portugal (1762–1830), Portuguese opera composer
Mark Portugal (b. 1962), United States baseball player
Miguel Ángel Portugal (b. 1955), Spanish footballer
Yisroel Avrohom Portugal (1923–2019), Rabbi (second Skulener Rebbe)

See also
Portugal (disambiguation)